Windmill Theatre, now The Windmill International, is a theatre in Great Windmill Street, London .

Windmill Theatre may also refer to: 

Windmill Theatre Co, a leading performing arts company based in Adelaide, South Australia